The Stuart School of Business (often just Stuart or Stuart School) is an academic unit of the Illinois Institute of Technology, a private Ph.D.-granting technological university.

Stuart offers bachelor's, master's, doctoral, and non-degree programs, as well as graduate certificate programs.  In addition to the MBA and MPA, Stuart offers Master of Science programs in Marketing Analytics, Sustainability Management, and Finance. Stuart also offers dual degrees with Chicago-Kent College of Law, Institute of Design and the College of Science. Stuart also offers a Doctoral program in Management Science with concentrations in Finance and Operations.

Stuart's Master of Science in Finance program is taught by a team of 12 full-time faculty and a number of adjunct faculty drawn from the local financial services industry. One of the largest specialized finance programs in the United States, Stuart's M.S. Finance program had 300 enrolled students in Fall 2013. Students can specialize in concentrations including: alternative investments, corporate finance, entrepreneurial finance, financial econometrics, financial engineering, financial markets, financial programming, high frequency trading, investment management, risk management, and trading. These concentrations provide students with focused knowledge in their preferred career area.  Stuart also provides a variety of extra- and co-curricular activities for students, including: Stuart Investments, CFA Competition, CME Trading Competition, and participation in professional societies. M.S. Finance was ranked 6th in the United States and 33rd globally overall in the 2015 Financial Times survey of M.S. Finance programs. Professor John F. O. Bilson is the director of the M.S. Finance program.

The graduate program in Public Administration encompasses the disciplines of political science and sociology, with special emphases in the fields of urban government and community affairs, policy analysis, organization and management of work, public finance, public safety, and nonprofit management. Illinois Tech has offered educational programs in public administration since the 1940s with Herbert A. Simon's groundbreaking, interdisciplinary work, and has awarded the Master of Public Administration (M.P.A.) degree, the most widely recognized professional credential, since the mid-1960s.

Stuart is located in the Bronzeville neighborhood of Chicago, Illinois, United States.

Historical timelines
 1969 Year of foundation of the Stuart School of Business.
 1971 Year Full-time MBA program was founded.
 1980 Year Part-time MBA program was founded.
 1999 Stuart achieved accreditation from AACSB, the Association to Advance Collegiate Schools of Business.
 2005 Knapp Entrepreneurship Center founded.
 2007 Center for Strategic Competitiveness (CSC) established.
 2007 Year of foundation of Center for the Management of Medical Technology.

Accreditation
Stuart is accredited by the AACSB, the Association to Advance Collegiate Schools of Business.  As part of the Illinois Institute of Technology, Stuart is also accredited by the North Central Association of Colleges and Secondary Schools.

Awards
A team of five students from the Stuart School of Business won the 2012 CFA Institute Research Challenge’s Americas Regional final, defeating teams from 45 universities to advance to the global final. The team presented investment research and recommendations for Zebra Technologies Corporation (NASDAQ: ZBRA), which has an extensive portfolio of bar code, receipt, card and kiosk supplies, RFID printers, and real-time location solutions. The team's work was based on interactions with Zebra's senior executives, investment thesis and risks analysis, financial modeling, valuation, comparable benchmarking, and scenario creation. The global final included three other teams from Thailand, Sweden, and the United States, with Illinois Tech's team representing the CFA Society of Chicago.

Departments and research centers
 Center for Strategic Competitiveness (CSC)
 Center for Financial Markets (CFM)
 Center for Sustainable Enterprise (CSE)
 Illinois Tech Leadership Academy
 Interprofessional Projects Program (IPRO)

Academic programs
Programs Offered
 Masters in Business Administration (MBA)
 Master of Public Administration (MPA)
 Masters of Science
 Sustainability Management
 Finance
 Marketing Analytics
 Professional Masters
 Mathematical Finance
 Master of Technological Entrepreneurship (MTE)
 PhD in Management Science
 Finance
 Operations
 Dual Degrees
 MBA / MS (2 Years)
 JD/MBA
 MBA / MPA
 MDes / MBA (2 - 3 Years)
 MBA / MSF
 MS / JD
 MPA / JD
 MPA / BS (Political Science)
 Bachelor of Science
 Certificates programs
 Public Administration Certificates

Noteworthy alumni
 John Calamos ('65 MBA), Billionaire money manager
 Carl S. Spetzler ('63 BS ChE, '65 MBA, '68 PhD) CEO Strategic Decisions Group.

References

External links
IIT Stuart School of Business, official site

Illinois Institute of Technology
1969 establishments in Illinois
Business schools in Illinois
Educational institutions established in 1969